Upper Broghindrummin (also known as Dira) is a townland of 186 acres in County Antrim, Northern Ireland. It is situated in the historic barony of Glenarm Lower and the civil parish of Layd (Grange of Layd).

See also 
List of townlands in County Antrim
List of places in County Antrim

References

Townlands of County Antrim
Civil parish of Layd